Kenneth Trimble (March 1, 1919 – May 8, 1991) was an American musician who was a member of Lawrence Welk's orchestra from 1957 to 1982. His instrument was the trombone.

Born and reared in Milwaukee, Wisconsin, Trimble taught himself the trombone at age five and later became a Wisconsin State champion trombonist. After serving in an Army band during World War II, Trimble played with various bands such as Tex Beneke, Ray Anthony and Glenn Miller prior to joining Welk in 1957. He appeared on the Maestro's weekly television show and toured with the band on their live concert tours for the next twenty-five years. His talents were not limited to the brass section, he also provided vocals in many group numbers that were featured on the show.

Trimble's son, Jimmy, became a professional musician in his own right and also plays the trombone. Trimble's grandson Jon plays the trumpet.

References

1919 births
1991 deaths
American jazz trombonists
Male trombonists
Musicians from Milwaukee
20th-century American musicians
Lawrence Welk
20th-century trombonists
American male jazz musicians
20th-century American male musicians
United States Army personnel of World War II